John Donald Abney (March 10, 1923 – January 27, 2000) was an American jazz pianist.

Early life
Abney was born in Baltimore, Maryland. He studied piano and french horn at the Manhattan School of Music. He joined the United States Army where he played the French horn in the army band and achieved the rank of technician fifth grade.

Later life and career
After returning from the army he played in ensembles with Wilbur de Paris, Bill Harris, Kai Winding, Chuck Wayne, Sy Oliver, and Louis Bellson. He had a sustained career as a session musician, playing on recordings for Louis Armstrong, Benny Carter, Oscar Pettiford, Ella Fitzgerald, Carmen McRae, Sarah Vaughan, Eartha Kitt, and Pearl Bailey. He also played on many recordings for more minor musicians and on R&B, pop, rock, and doo wop releases.

After moving to Hollywood, he worked as a musical director for Universal Studios/MCA. He appeared as a pianist in the film Pete Kelly's Blues behind Ella Fitzgerald. Additional credits include recording and arrangements for the film Lady Sings the Blues. He toured with Anita O'Day in the 1980s. Early in the 1990s, he moved to Japan and toured there with considerable success, playing weekly at the Sanno Hotel in Tokyo. Upon his return to the United States on January 20 2000, he died of complications from kidney dialysis in Los Angeles, California. He was interred at Forest Lawn Cemetery, in Burbank, California. He is survived by 5 children.

Discography

As sideman
With Ella Fitzgerald
Ella at Zardi's (Verve, 2017)
With Louis Bellson
Louis Bellson Quintet (Norgran, 1954)
Drumorama! (Verve, 1957)
Louis Bellson at The Flamingo (Verve, 1957)
With Benny Carter
Benny Carter Plays Pretty (Norgran, 1954)
New Jazz Sounds (Norgran, 1954)
Moonglow: Love Songs by Benny Carter and his Orchestra (Verve, 1957)
With Harry Edison
"Sweets" for the Sweet (Sue, 1964)
With Carmen McRae
Birds of a Feather (Decca, 1958)
With Oscar Pettiford
Another One (Bethlehem, 1955)
With Al Sears
Rockin' in Rhythm (Swingville, 1960) as The Swingville All-Stars with Taft Jordan and Hilton Jefferson 
Swing's the Thing (Swingsville, 1960)
With Carol Sloane
As Time Goes By  (Four Star, 1990)

References

[ Don Abney] at Allmusic

1923 births
2000 deaths
Musicians from Baltimore
American jazz pianists
American male pianists
American session musicians
20th-century American pianists
Jazz musicians from Maryland
20th-century American male musicians
American male jazz musicians
United States Army soldiers